Chapagain is a surname found in Nepal. It is a toponymic family name from Chapagaun village in Dailekh district. Notable people with the surname includes

Bidhya Chapagain, Nepalese journalist
Dharma Sila Chapagain, Nepalese politician 
Suraj Chapagain, Nepalese actor

References

Nepali-language surnames
Surnames of Nepalese origin
Khas surnames